Robert Charles Griffiths, FRS is an Australian mathematician and statistician known for his work in mathematical population genetics. He is professor of mathematical genetics in the University of Oxford, and a fellow and tutor at Lady Margaret Hall.

He was elected a Fellow of the Royal Society in 2010.

References

External links
Bob Griffiths University of Oxford Department of Statistics
Prof Robert Griffiths Lady Margaret Hall

Year of birth missing (living people)
Australian statisticians
Population geneticists
Australian expatriates in the United Kingdom
Living people
Fellows of Lady Margaret Hall, Oxford
Fellows of the Royal Society